Believe is the tenth studio album by British heavy metal band, Girlschool, released on Communiqué Records in 2004. It was the first album entirely played by the formation with new lead guitarist Jackie Chambers. It was re-released in 2008 in a limited edition, including the DVD Around the World, with footage from concerts and tours of 2004 and 2005. This limited edition was self-produced and sold through their official website and at concerts.

Track listing

DVD track listing
"Come On Up" video clip
Girlschool Around the World
Interview with Radio Northampton
Photogallery
Jackie's Birthday

Credits
Kim McAuliffe – rhythm guitar, lead vocals on tracks 2, 4, 5, 6, 9, 10, 11, 13, 14, backing vocals
Jackie Chambers – lead guitar, backing vocals
Enid Williams – bass, lead vocals on tracks 1, 3, 7, 8, 12, 15, backing vocals 
Denise Dufort – drums

References

External links
Official Girlschool discography

2004 albums
Girlschool albums
2004 live albums
2004 video albums
Live video albums